Francisco "Paco" Fogués Domenech (born 6 August 1977) is a former professional tennis player from Spain.

Biography
A left-handed player from Valencia, Fogués turned professional at the age of 21. His coaches included Salvador Roselló and former ATP Tour player José Altur.

He was runner-up at Challenger tournaments at Trandi and Brindisi in 2003.

Both of his main draw appearances on the ATP Tour came in 2005. At the 2005 Torneo Godó in Barcelona he made it through qualifying, then had a first round win over Christophe Rochus, before his run by ended by Nikolay Davydenko. He also featured as a qualifier at Sankt Pölten and was beaten in the first round by Félix Mantilla.

Fogués, who has previously coached Pablo Andújar, has been the coach of David Ferrer since 2014.

ATP Challenger and ITF Futures finals

Singles: 13 (6–7)

Doubles: 1 (0–1)

References

External links
 
 

1977 births
Living people
Spanish male tennis players
Spanish tennis coaches
Sportspeople from Valencia
Tennis players from the Valencian Community